Milyutinsky District is an administrative and municipal district (raion), one of the forty-three in Rostov Oblast, Russia. It is located in the northeast of the oblast. Its administrative center is the rural locality (a stanitsa) of Milyutinskaya. Population: 15,082 (2010 Census);  The population of Milyutinskaya accounts for 16.7% of the district's total population.

References

Notes

Sources

Districts of Rostov Oblast